John Hannyngton may refer to:
 John Child Hannyngton, judge in the East India Company 
 John Caulfield Hannyngton, his father, British military commander, actuary and mathematician